Sport Club Rio Grande is a professional association football club based in Rio Grande, Rio Grande do Sul, Brazil. Founded in July 1900, they are Brazil's oldest active football club. 

They play in the second division of the Campeonato Gaúcho, which the club won in 1936; its greatest achievement to date.

History
Sport Club Rio Grande were founded on July 19, 1900, by the German Christian Moritz Minnemann and a group of friends, during the celebrations of his 25th anniversary. The club won its first achievement, which is the Campeonato Gaúcho, in 1936. Brazil's National Football Day is celebrated on July 19 in honor of Sport Club Rio Grande's condition as Brazil's oldest football club.

Stadium
Rio Grande play their home games at Estádio Arthur Lawson. The stadium has a maximum capacity of 5,000 people, and was inaugurated on August 31, 1985.

Achievements

 Campeonato Gaúcho First Division:
 Winners (1): 1936
 Campeonato Gaúcho Second Division:
 Winners (1): 1962
 Campeonato Gaúcho Third Division:
 Winners (1): 2014
 Runners-up (1): 1985

Derby
The derby between SC São Paulo and Rio Grande is known as Rio-Rita.

References

External links
 Official website

Rio Grande
Rio Grande
1900 establishments in Brazil